Zahid Sharif (born 11 November 1967) is a Pakistani field hockey player. He competed in the men's tournament at the 1988 Summer Olympics.

References

External links
 

1967 births
Living people
Pakistani male field hockey players
Olympic field hockey players of Pakistan
Field hockey players at the 1988 Summer Olympics
Field hockey players from Lahore